The  is a DC electric multiple unit (EMU) commuter train type operated by the private railway operator Tobu Railway in Japan since 1997. Initially formed as six-car and four-car sets, sets are mostly formed as permanently coupled ten-car formations since 2011.

Formations
, the fleet consists of one six-car and one four-car set based at Minami-Kurihashi and Kasukabe depots for Tobu Skytree Line and Tobu Nikko Line services, and 14 permanently coupled 6+4-car sets based at Shinrinkoen Depot for Tobu Tojo Line services.

10-car Tobu Tojo Line sets

 The M1 and M1A cars are each fitted with two single-arm pantographs, and the M3 cars are fitted with one.
 Cars 2, 3, 6, and 9 have wheelchair spaces.

6-car sets

The M1 cars are fitted with two single-arm pantographs, and the M3 cars are fitted with one.

4-car sets

The M1A cars are fitted with two single-arm pantographs.

Bogies

Interior
Passenger accommodation consists of longitudinal seating throughout.

The first three sets delivered, sets 31601, 31401, and 31402, had flat panels on the seat ends and no centre stanchions. Set 31403 was fitted with contoured seats, and these were fitted on all subsequent sets delivered. Sets 31607 and 31407 onward had higher light blue panels on the seat ends.

History

The first set, 31601, was delivered in November 1996, with the first trains entering service on 25 March 1997. Initially used primarily on Tobu Isesaki Line services, they were introduced on through-running services to and from the Tokyu Den-en-toshi Line via the Tokyo Metro Hanzomon Line from March 2003, operating in 6+4-car formations. However, as the driving cabs between the two sets led to reduced capacity, which hampered the fleet's ability to cope with the congestion rates of the Hanzomon and Den-en-toshi lines, the 30000 series' usage on these services was reduced in late 2005. They were largely superseded by new 50050 series fixed 10-car sets from 18 March 2006. Sets withdrawn from Hanzomon Line through services were reallocated to services on the Isesaki, Nikko, and Utsunomiya lines.

Transfer to Tojo Line
From January 2011, pairs of four- and six-car sets were transferred to the Tobu Tojo Line, commencing with sets 31601 and 31401. These sets entered revenue service from 13 June 2011 following modifications at Shinrinkōen Depot to form a permanently coupled 10-car set with control equipment and skirts removed from the two intermediate driving cabs. In addition, the electrical couplers from the end cars were removed.

Fixed 10-car set conversion dates

Notes

References

Further reading

External links

 Tobu 30000 series 

Electric multiple units of Japan
30000 series
Train-related introductions in 1997
Alna Koki rolling stock
Fuji rolling stock
Tokyu Car multiple units
1500 V DC multiple units of Japan